The following is a list of federal, state, and local elections in the U.S. state of Maryland and can refer to one of the following elections:

 Primary elections in Maryland
 Maryland gubernatorial elections
 United States Senate election in Maryland
 United States House of Representatives elections in Maryland
 Maryland Comptroller election
 United States presidential election in Maryland
 Frederick mayoral election
 Baltimore mayoral election, among others

In a 2020 study, Maryland was ranked as the 5th easiest state for citizens to vote in.

1966
1966 Maryland gubernatorial election

1969
1969 Maryland special gubernatorial election

1982
1982 United States House of Representatives elections in Maryland

1984
1984 United States House of Representatives elections in Maryland

1986
1986 United States House of Representatives elections in Maryland
1986 United States Senate election in Maryland

1988
1988 United States House of Representatives elections in Maryland
1988 United States Senate election in Maryland

1992
1992 United States presidential election in Maryland
1992 United States House of Representatives elections in Maryland
1992 United States Senate election in Maryland

1994
1994 United States House of Representatives elections in Maryland
1994 United States Senate election in Maryland
1994 Maryland State Senate elections

1996
1996 United States presidential election in Maryland
1996 United States House of Representatives elections in Maryland

1998
1998 United States House of Representatives elections in Maryland
1998 United States Senate election in Maryland
1998 Maryland gubernatorial election

1999
1999 Baltimore mayoral election

2000
2000 United States presidential election in Maryland
2000 United States House of Representatives elections in Maryland
2000 United States Senate election in Maryland

2002
2002 United States House of Representatives elections in Maryland
2002 Maryland gubernatorial election
Question P, local referendum to reduce the size of the Baltimore City Council

2004
2004 United States presidential election in Maryland
2004 United States House of Representatives elections in Maryland
2004 United States Senate election in Maryland

2006
2006 Maryland gubernatorial election
2006 United States House of Representatives elections in Maryland
2006 Maryland Attorney General election
2006 Maryland Comptroller election

2007
2007 Baltimore mayoral election

2008
2008 United States presidential election in Maryland
2008 United States House of Representatives elections in Maryland
2008 Maryland's 4th congressional district special election
Maryland Democratic primary, 2008
Maryland Republican primary, 2008

2010
2010 Maryland gubernatorial election
2010 United States House of Representatives elections in Maryland
2010 Maryland Attorney General election
2010 Maryland Comptroller election

2011
2011 Baltimore mayoral election

2012
2012 United States presidential election in Maryland
2012 United States House of Representatives elections in Maryland
2012 United States Senate election in Maryland
Question 6, statewide referendum to legalize same-sex marriage

2014
2014 Maryland gubernatorial election
2014 United States House of Representatives elections in Maryland
2014 Maryland Attorney General election
2014 Maryland Comptroller election

2016
2016 Maryland Democratic presidential primary
2016 Maryland Republican presidential primary
2016 United States presidential election in Maryland
2016 United States Senate election in Maryland
2016 United States House of Representatives elections in Maryland
2016 Baltimore mayoral election

2018
2018 United States House of Representatives elections in Maryland
2018 United States Senate election in Maryland
2018 Maryland gubernatorial election
2018 Maryland Attorney General election
2018 Maryland Comptroller election

2020

2020 United States presidential election in Maryland
2020 United States House of Representatives elections in Maryland
2020 Baltimore mayoral election

2022

2022 United States House of Representatives elections in Maryland
2022 United States Senate election in Maryland
2022 Maryland gubernatorial election
2022 Maryland Attorney General election
2022 Maryland Comptroller election

See also
Political party strength in Maryland
United States presidential elections in Maryland

References

External links
Elections, Voting, & Registration at the Maryland Secretary of State official website

 
 
  (State affiliate of the U.S. League of Women Voters)
 

 
Elections
Political events in Maryland